William Augustus, also known as Wil Awst, was a Welsh translator and weather forecaster in the late 18th century. He lived at Cil-y-cwm, near Llandovery in Carmarthenshire.

Forecasting
Augustus contributed translations for the Welsh portion of a 1794 book about weather lore, The Husbandman's Perpetual Prognostication, which was published by John Ross in Carmarthen in 1794.

Augustus gained renown locally for his ability to forecast to within an hour the onset of weather events such as thunderstorms and gales. His forecasts were intended mainly for those involved in farming the land.

References

Welsh translators
Weather forecasting
18th-century Welsh writers
18th-century British male writers
18th-century British translators
People from Carmarthenshire